William Albert Hajt (born November 18, 1951) is a Canadian former professional ice hockey defenceman who played in the NHL from 1973 until 1987. He featured in the 1975 Stanley Cup Finals with the Buffalo Sabres.

Hajt was drafted 33rd overall by the Buffalo Sabres in the 1971 NHL Amateur Draft. He played 854 career NHL games, all with the Sabres, scoring 42 goals and 202 assists for 244 points. His highest point total of his career was actually his rookie season, when he registered 29 points and a plus minus rating of +47.

Bill is the father of Ontario Reign assistant coach Chris Hajt who played six games in the National Hockey League for the Edmonton Oilers and the Washington Capitals.

Career statistics

See also
Notable families in the NHL

External links
 

1951 births
Living people
Buffalo Sabres draft picks
Buffalo Sabres players
Canadian ice hockey defencemen
Canadian people of Slovenian descent
Cincinnati Swords players
Ice hockey people from Saskatchewan
Saskatoon Blades players